Thomas Winford may refer to:
Thomas Geers Winford (c. 1697–1751), British lawyer and politician
Sir Thomas Winford, 1st Baronet (died 1702), of the Winford baronets
Sir Thomas Winford, 2nd Baronet (1673–1744), of the Winford baronets, MP for Worcestershire

See also
Winford (disambiguation)